Polycheles suhmi, the blind lobster, is a species of crustacean resembling a prawn or a squat lobster. It was first described by Charles Spence Bate in 1878.

It was first found off the coast of Tasmania, 95 km northeast of Flinders Island.

References 

Polychelida